The OWL Party of Washington was a minor political party founded in a jazz club, the Tumwater Conservatory, in Tumwater, Washington, to field candidates in the 1976 elections. It was founded by entertainer Red Kelly, owner of the establishment where it was founded. The party's name was a double acronym, standing for "Out With Logic, On With Lunacy", and its motto was "We don't give a hoot!" The ease with which this frivolous party gained access to a place on the ballot led the Washington legislature to significantly increase the difficulty of minor-party access. The changes were challenged, ultimately for the most part unsuccessfully, by established minor parties such as the Socialist Workers Party.

References

External links
Secretary of State of the State of Washington OWL Party page
OWL Party page at ourcampaigns.com
US Supreme Court argument (MP3 file) referring to OWL Party

Political parties in Washington (state)
Political parties established in 1976
Joke political parties in the United States
1976 establishments in Washington (state)